11β-Chloromethylestradiol (11β-CME2; developmental code name ORG-4333) is a synthetic steroidal estrogen which was never marketed. It has very high affinity for the estrogen receptor and dissociates from it relatively slowly. It was originally thought that 11β-CME2 might be a covalent ligand of the estrogen receptors, but its binding was subsequently shown to be fully reversible. The relative binding affinity of 11β-CME2 for the estrogen receptors ranges from 230 to 3,320% of that of estradiol depending on the study. 11β-CME2 also has about 14% of the relative binding affinity of estradiol for sex hormone-binding globulin (SHBG). The compound has been developed as a radiolabel for the ERs.

See also
 11β-Methoxyestradiol
 Moxestrol

References

Abandoned drugs
Secondary alcohols
Estranes
Organochlorides
Synthetic estrogens